Thomas Hart Reynolds (July 31, 1857 - May 1, 1913) was a Major League Baseball pitcher who started two games in  with the Philadelphia Athletics.

He was born in Philadelphia, Pennsylvania and died in Buffalo, New York.

References

External links

1857 births
1913 deaths
Major League Baseball pitchers
Baseball players from New York (state)
Philadelphia Athletics (AA) players
19th-century baseball players
People from Allegany, New York